George Philip Cecil Arthur Stanhope, 7th Earl of Chesterfield (28 September 1831 – 1 December 1871), styled Lord Stanhope until 1866, was a British soldier, and Conservative politician who sat in the House of Commons from 1860 until 1866 when he inherited his peerage and sat in the House of Lords. He was a cricketer who played first-class cricket for Nottinghamshire and was the first president of Derbyshire County Cricket Club.

Background
Chesterfield was the only son of George Stanhope, 6th Earl of Chesterfield, and the Hon. Anne Elizabeth, daughter of Cecil Weld-Forester, 1st Baron Forester. He was educated at Eton. He played club cricket for I Zingari and for Old Etonians in 1851.

Military and political career
Chesterfield entered the British Army and achieved the rank of lieutenant in the Royal Horse Guards. He retired in 1855. In 1860 he was elected at a by-election as Member of Parliament (MP) for Nottinghamshire South, a seat he held until 1866, when he succeeded his father in the earldom and took his seat in the House of Lords.

Cricket
Lord Chesterfield was one of the pioneers of Derbyshire cricket. In 1857 and in 1859 played for a pre-county Derbyshire side against All England XIs. He also played for I Zingari.

In 1860 Chesterfield played first-class cricket for Gentlemen of the North and for Nottinghamshire. He also played for Nottingham and All England XIs. In 1861 he played first-class matches again for Northern Gent's and Nottinghamshire. He also turned out for Marylebone Cricket Club and Gentlemen of the Midland Counties.

Chesterfield played ten innings in five first-class matches with an average of 13.50 and a top score of 65.

In 1870 Chesterfield was one of the founders of Derbyshire County Cricket Club and became the club's first president.

Personal life
In November 1871 Lord Chesterfield stayed at Londesborough Lodge, Scarborough, with, among others, the Prince of Wales. Both Chesterfield and the Prince contracted typhoid fever. The Prince recovered while Lord Chesterfield died from the illness. He was unmarried and was succeeded in the earldom by his third cousin, George Stanhope.

References

External links 
 

1831 births
1871 deaths
People educated at Eton College
Nottinghamshire cricketers
Deaths from typhoid fever
Conservative Party (UK) MPs for English constituencies
UK MPs 1859–1865
UK MPs 1865–1868
UK MPs who inherited peerages
English cricketers
George
Gentlemen of the North cricketers
Earls of Chesterfield
Royal Horse Guards officers